
Year 478 BC was a year of the pre-Julian Roman calendar. At the time, it was known as the Year of the Consulship of Mamercus and Structus (or, less frequently, year 276 Ab urbe condita). The denomination 478 BC for this year has been used since the early medieval period, when the Anno Domini calendar era became the prevalent method in Europe for naming years.

Events 
 By place 
 Greece 
 Despite Spartan opposition, Athens works on refortifying and rebuilding after the Persian destruction of the city in 479.
 The Delian League is established
 With the help of the Athenian statesman and general, Cimon, Aristides commands an Athenian fleet of 30 ships that the Spartan commander Pausanias leads to capture the Greek cities on Cyprus and Byzantium, taking them from the Persians and their Phoenician allies.
 While Pausanias is occupying Byzantium, his arrogance and his adoption of Persian clothing and manners offends the allies and raises suspicions of disloyalty. Pausanias is recalled to Sparta, where he is tried and acquitted of the charge of treason, but he is not restored to his command.

 Sicily 
 Hiero I (Hieron) becomes the Tyrant of Syracuse following the death of his brother Gelo.

 China 
 A Temple of Confucius is established in (modern-day) Qufu.

Births

Deaths 
 Gelo, tyrant of the cities of Gela and Syracuse in Sicily

References